Mess of Blues is an album recorded by American jazz saxophonist Johnny Hodges and organist Wild Bill Davis featuring performances recorded in 1963 and released on the Verve label.

Reception

The Allmusic site awarded the album 3 stars stating "Hodges plays typically beautifully on such numbers as "I Cried for You," "Lost in Meditation" and "Stolen Sweets" and, although no real surprises occur (and the playing time at around a half-hour is quite brief), the performances are up to par". Of the seven studio albums recorded by Hodges and Wild Bill Davis from 1961 to 1966, Mess of Blues is the only album that does not utilize a bass player (though the live session Wild Bill Davis & Johnny Hodges in Atlantic City similarly forgoes a bass player).

Track listing
 "Jones" (Duke Ellington, Pauline Reddon) - 4:43
 "I Cried for You" (Arthur Freed, Abe Lyman, Gus Arnheim) - 3:02
 "Love You Madly" (Duke Ellington) - 3:51
 "Little John, Little John" (Johnny Hodges) - 4:03
 "Stolen Sweets" (Wild Bill Davis) - 3:14
 "A&R Blues" (Hodges) - 6:07
 "Lost in Meditation" (Ellington, Irving Mills, Juan Tizol, Lou Singer) - 3:17

Personnel
Johnny Hodges - alto saxophone
Wild Bill Davis - organ
Kenny Burrell - guitar
Ed Shaughnessy - drums

References

Johnny Hodges albums
Wild Bill Davis albums
1964 albums
Albums produced by Creed Taylor
Verve Records albums